General elections are due to be held in Tuvalu in September 2023.

Electoral system
The 15 members of Parliament are elected in eight constituencies using first-past-the-post voting. Seven islands are two-seat constituencies, whilst Nukulaelae is a single-member constituency. There are no political parties and all candidates run as independents.

References

Elections in Tuvalu
Tuvalu
2023 in Tuvalu